In astrology, a diurnal sign is a sign in the zodiac whose natural positions are on the southern hemisphere of the horoscope.  The diurnal signs are therefore:-

 Libra
 Scorpio
 Sagittarius
 Capricorn
 Aquarius
 Pisces

Note:  The hemispheres are opposite their representation on the horoscope. Therefore, the southern hemisphere will be seen on the top of the horoscope.

Western astrological signs